Hudson's Bay Trading Company, L.P. was an American portfolio company for NRDC Equity Partners, a private equity company. Hudson's Bay Trading Company was founded in 2008.

NRDC Equity Partners was founded by Robert Baker and Richard Baker of National Realty and Development Corp., and William Mack and Lee Neibart of AREA Property Partners. Richard Baker served as President CEO of NRDC Equity Partners.

On January 23, 2012, The Financial Post reported that Baker had dissolved Hudson’s Bay Trading Co., and Toronto-based Hudson's Bay Company will now operate both The Bay and Lord & Taylor. This new entity will be run by The Bay CEO Bonnie Brooks. CEO Brendan Hoffman will leave Lord & Taylor and take over as CEO at the department store chain Bon Ton. Baker will remain governor and CEO of the business and Donald Watros will stay on as chief operating officer.

Assets

Canada
 Hudson's Bay Company, a Canadian retail company consisting of:
 The Bay, a high-end  department store chain
 Zellers, a mass-market department store
 Home Outfitters, a home decor retailer
 Fields, a variety store chain

United States
 Lord & Taylor, a high-end department store chain

References

External links
NRDC Equity Partners
National Realty & Development Corp.
AREA Property Partners
Lord & Taylor
Hbc Department Stores

Hudson's Bay Company
Retail companies established in 2008
Retail companies disestablished in 2012
Retail companies based in New York City
Holding companies of Canada
Holding companies established in 2008
Holding companies disestablished in 2012
Holding companies of the United States